Aguieira Dam also known as Foz do Dão Dam is a concrete multiple arch dam on the Mondego River, where the river forms the border line between the districts of Coimbra and Viseu. It is located in the municipality Penacova, in Coimbra District, Portugal.

Construction of the dam began in 1972. The dam was completed in 1981. It is owned by Companhia Portuguesa de Produção de Electricidade (CPPE). Besides power production the dam is also used for flood control, water supply and irrigation.

Dam
Aguieira Dam is an 89 m tall (height above foundation) and 400 m long multiple arch dam with a crest altitude of 125 m. The volume of the dam is 365,000 m³. The dam contains 2 crest spillways (maximum discharge 2,080 m³/s) and one bottom outlet (maximum discharge 180 m³/s).

Reservoir
At full reservoir level of 117 m (maximum flood level of 126 m) the reservoir of the dam has a surface area of 20 km² and its total capacity is 423 mio. m³. Its active capacity is 304 (216 or 253) mio. m³. Minimum operating level is 100 m. With the 216 mio. m³ water 39.2 GWh can be produced. The reservoir submerged the villages of Breda (in the municipality of Mortágua) and Foz do Dão (in the municipality of Santa Comba Dão).

Power plant 
The power plant went operational in 1981. It is a pumped-storage hydroelectric power station. It is owned by CPPE, but operated by EDP and Iberdrola. The plant has a nameplate capacity of 336 (270) MW. Its average annual generation is 209.9 (193, 209.6 or 256) GWh.

The power station contains 3 Francis turbine-generators with 112.4 MW each in a surface powerhouse at the toe of the dam. The turbine rotation is 125 rpm. The minimum hydraulic head is 53.4 m, the maximum 71.6 m. Maximum flow per turbine is 180 m³/s. When pumping, the turbine has a maximum energy consumption of 91 MW and can pump 156 m³/s.

As lower reservoir for Aguieira the reservoir of Raiva dam is used.

See also

 List of power stations in Portugal
 List of dams and reservoirs in Portugal

References

Dams in Portugal
Pumped-storage hydroelectric power stations in Portugal
Arch dams
Dams completed in 1981
Energy infrastructure completed in 1981
1981 establishments in Portugal
Buildings and structures in Coimbra District
Buttress dams